Héctor Alejandro Mascorro López (born 12 May 1997) is a Mexican professional footballer who plays as a midfielder for Liga de Expansión MX club Pumas Tabasco, on loan from UNAM.

International career
Mascorro was included in the under-21 roster that participated in the 2018 Toulon Tournament, where Mexico would finish runners-up.

Honours
Pachuca
Liga MX: Clausura 2016

References

External links
 

1997 births
Living people
Association football midfielders
C.F. Pachuca players
Mineros de Zacatecas players
Club León footballers
Liga MX players
Ascenso MX players
Liga Premier de México players
Tercera División de México players
Footballers from Coahuila
Mexican footballers
Sportspeople from Monclova